The 1st International Gold Cup was a non-championship Formula One motor race held on 7 August 1954 at the Oulton Park Circuit, Cheshire. The race was run over 36 laps of the circuit, and was won by British driver Stirling Moss in a Maserati 250F. Reg Parnell was second in a Ferrari and Bob Gerard, who qualified on pole, third in his Cooper-Bristol.

This was Moss's first Formula One win; he had won the Aintree 200 earlier in the season but that was a Formula Libre event.

Results

References 

International Gold Cup
International Gold Cup
International Gold Cup